The Downtown Grand, formerly the Lady Luck, is a hotel and casino in downtown Las Vegas, Nevada, owned by CIM Group and operated by Fifth Street Gaming. The Downtown Grand is the centerpiece of Downtown3rd, a new neighborhood and entertainment district in downtown Las Vegas.

Facility
The East Tower is connected to the ground level casino. The eight-story Gallery Tower was completed in 2020, for a total of 1,124 rooms. The property is served by a four-level parking garage and features several restaurants and entertainment venues along 3rd Street. These establishments include Freedom Beat, Triple George Grill, Sidebar, and Hogs and Heifers Saloon.

History

Honest John's (1961-1968)
 The original business was a news stand and barber shop located in Ogden Square Shopping Center. Honest John's became a full-time casino in 1964, operated by Andy Tompkins, who would eventually become the founder of Lady Luck.

Lady Luck (1968–2006)
 1968: Former Honest John's reopens as Lady Luck. Casino building expanded in 1979.
 Tower 1 (17 floors) opened in 1986; Tower 2 (24 floors) opened in 1989. 
 In 2000 the Lady Luck was acquired by Isle of Capri Casinos.
 On June, 2002 it was purchased by Steadfast AMX who turned two floors into timeshares. 
 On May 13, 2005 it was purchased by the Henry Brent Company for $24 million.
 On May 16, 2005 plans were announced for a major renovation and expansion of the property to begin early in 2006.

Closing and renovations (2006–13)
On February 11, 2006 the hotel and casino, but not the timeshares, closed for remodeling; the property was expected to be closed for nine to twelve months but financing collapsed. 

On June 12, 2007 the casino was acquired by CIM Group for over $100 million.

In July 2008 the city was investigating rezoning the nearby land containing the transit center to unrestricted gaming. With the transit center relocated, the land would be available for development. Mayor Oscar Goodman applauded the attempt to re-invigorate the plans to renovate the Lady Luck: "For the past several years I have seen a rotting corpse. The Lady Luck structure has been a blight."

As of July 2009, Goodman once again said in a council meeting that "The Lady Luck is a disaster," and then called the skeletal structure a "carcass". Las Vegas city leaders wanted CIM to raze the unfinished structure at Fourth Street and Stewart Avenue and do a better job of keeping sidewalks and landscaping clean near the site. CIM had until late December 2009 to begin a $100 million renovation of the Lady Luck; otherwise, it would potentially lose an offer from the city which would hand over land around the proposed nearby Mob Museum.

On July 23, 2009, some demolition work started on a 4-story concrete building adjacent to the main resort. This work was completed in accordance with the city's request for CIM to raze the condemned structure.

On March 15, 2010, CIM made an agreement with city officials to have the renovations completed by December 31, 2011. There was the potential that the hotel/casino would reopen in 2012, five years after its originally scheduled reopening in 2007.

In October 2011, plans were announced to rename the Lady Luck as the Downtown Grand. The property underwent a $100 million renovation. Construction of Downtown3rd on the former site of the Lady Luck began in the fall of 2011. The new Downtown Grand was scheduled to open in late 2013, and the remainder of Downtown3rd was expected to be completed in late 2014.

Downtown Grand (2013–present)

Downtown Grand opened on October 27, 2013.

In January 2019, construction began on a 495-room hotel tower. The eight-story tower, located on the east side of the Downtown Grand property, was topped off in February 2020. The addition, known as the Gallery Tower, opened on September 22, 2020, bringing the total room count to 1,124. It includes various augmented reality art pieces.

References

External links

 

Casinos in the Las Vegas Valley
Downtown Las Vegas
Hotel buildings completed in 1964
Casino hotels
1964 establishments in Nevada